Komnen Andrić (born 1 July 1995) is a Serbian professional footballer who plays as a forward for  club Clermont.

Club career

Early career
On 27 February 2013, Andrić made his senior debut for Radnički Kragujevac in the Serbian SuperLiga, coming on as a substitute against Rad. On 17 August 2013, Andrić scored his first senior goal against Napredak Kruševac in a 2–1 win. 

Andrić signed for Belenenses in the Primeira Liga in July 2016.

On 9 February 2017 he was loaned to Lithuanian A Lyga champions Žalgiris with a buy-out clause. Serb played only 9 times for Green Whites, scoring only once, so club decided not to use it and allow player to return to Belenenses on 30 June 2017.

Inter Zaprešić
On 31 August 2017, Andrić signed for Croatian club Inter Zaprešić. Over the course of two seasons with Inter Zaprešić, he became team captain under coach Samir Toplak. He was also the first Serbian captain in the history of the Croatian First Football League. He was the league's top scorer halfway into the 2018-19 season. In August 2018, he turned down an offer from Dinamo Zagreb.

Dinamo Zagreb
On 19 January 2019 he signed a five-year contract with Dinamo Zagreb in a €1 million transfer from Inter Zaprešić. He became the first Serbian footballer to play for Dinamo Zagreb since the breakup of Yugoslavia. On 24 February 2019, he scored his first goal for Dinamo Zagreb in a 3–0 win against Osijek.

On 16 October 2020, he joined Russian Premier League club Ufa on loan with an option to purchase. On 20 May 2021, Ufa announced that he will return to Dinamo Zagreb as his loan expired and Ufa decided not to exercise the option to purchase.

Clermont
On 15 July 2022, Andrić signed for French Ligue 1 side Clermont on a three-year deal with an option for extension.

Honours
Zalgiris
 Lithuanian Supercup: 2017

Dinamo Zagreb
 1. HNL: 2018–19
 Croatian Football Super Cup: 2019

References

External links
 
 Komnen Andrić Stats at utakmica.rs

1995 births
Living people
People from Raška, Serbia
Association football forwards
Serbian footballers
Serbian expatriate footballers
Serbia youth international footballers
FK Radnički 1923 players
OFK Beograd players
Serbian SuperLiga players
C.F. Os Belenenses players
Primeira Liga players
FK Žalgiris players
NK Inter Zaprešić players
GNK Dinamo Zagreb players
FC Ufa players
A Lyga players
Clermont Foot players
Ligue 1 players
Croatian Football League players
Russian Premier League players
Serbian expatriate sportspeople in Portugal
Expatriate footballers in Portugal
Serbian expatriate sportspeople in Lithuania
Expatriate footballers in Lithuania
Serbian expatriate sportspeople in Croatia
Expatriate footballers in Croatia
Serbian expatriate sportspeople in Russia
Expatriate footballers in Russia
Serbian expatriate sportspeople in France
Expatriate footballers in France